Cheshire's Silk 106.9 is an Independent Local Radio serving Macclesfield and parts of East Cheshire, owned and operated by neighbouring station Chester's Dee Radio.

It broadcasts a mix of current and classic hits alongside local news and sport.

As of December 2022, the station broadcasts to a weekly audience of 9,000, according to RAJAR.

History 
Silk FM launched on 25 May 1998 with special guest Sammy McIlroy, then manager of Macclesfield Town Football Club. Past presenters have included Nick Wright, Jeff Cooper, Guy Morris, Paul Allen and Trevor Thomas.

The station was previously owned by The Local Radio Company before being sold to the owners of Dee 106.3 in June 2009. In January 2017 the station moved into a new studio complex at Adelaide House, Adelaide Street in Macclesfield.

In November 2012, the station was granted a significant transmitter power increase, partly to combat co-channel interference from the Heart North and Mid Wales transmitter at the Moel-y-Parc transmitting station, also broadcasting on 106.9 MHz FM. The transmitter site at Sutton Common BT Tower offers a line of sight across the Cheshire plain, meaning the signal can be heard into Lancashire, Shropshire and Merseyside with transmissions going as far east as Greater Manchester and Derbyshire.

Community
The station awards the title School of the Week to schools within its broadcast area. Perhaps the most important awards it gives are the "Local Hero awards" which have been awarded since the stations inception.

The annual Cheshire Show is one of the highlights in the Silk calendar, of which the station offers extensive coverage.

Awards
In 2008, having been short-listed for the award in the previous year, Silk won Radio Station of the Year (under 300,000) at the Sony Radio Awards. It is again short-listed for the 2009 award.

In 2006, 2007 and 2008, Silk was named Radio Academy North West Station of the Year.

Programming
Some of Silk 106.9's programming is produced and broadcast from its Macclesfield studios. Live programming airs from 6am-7pm on weekdays, 8am-6pm on Saturdays and 8am-8pm on Sundays. Other output is automated or networked from Riverside Innovation Centre in Chester - Chester's Dee Radio.

Silk 106.9 broadcasts hourly local news bulletins from 6am–6pm on weekdays and 10am–2pm at weekends. National bulletins from Sky News Radio are carried every hour at all other times.

The station also airs weekly sports programming and Saturday afternoons, including regular coverage of Macclesfield FC and Congleton Town.

References

External links
Silk FM official site

Radio stations in Cheshire
Radio stations established in 1998